Elizabeth Haffenden (18 April 1906 – 29 May 1976) was a British costume designer who won two Academy Awards for Best Costume Design, for Ben-Hur at the 1959 Academy Awards and A Man for All Seasons at the 1966 Academy Awards. She also won the BAFTA Award.

Haffenden designed the costumes for most of the Gainsborough melodramas of the 1940s.

Selected filmography

 The Last Waltz (1936)
 The Young Mr. Pitt (1942) 
 The Man in Grey (1943)
 Fanny by Gaslight (1944)
 Give Us the Moon (1944)
 Two Thousand Women (1944)
 Love Story (1944)
 Madonna of the Seven Moons (1945)
 A Place of One's Own (1945)
 I'll Be Your Sweetheart (1945)
 Caravan (1946)
 Bedelia (1946)
 The Magic Bow (1946)
 The Man Within (1947)
 Jassy (1947)
 Uncle Silas (1947)
 The First Gentleman (1948)
 The Bad Lord Byron (1949)
 Christopher Columbus (1949)
Call of the Blood (1949)
 The Spider and the Fly (1949)
Ben-Hur (1959)
The Sundowners (1960)
A Man for All Seasons (1966)
Chitty Chitty Bang Bang (1968)
Fiddler on the Roof (1971)

References

External links

1906 births
1976 deaths
Best Costume Design Academy Award winners
Best Costume Design BAFTA Award winners
British costume designers
Women costume designers
People from Croydon